Iman Vellani (born August 12, 2002) is a Pakistani-Canadian actress. She is known for the Disney+ miniseries Ms. Marvel (2022) as the protagonist Kamala Khan, a role she will reprise in the film The Marvels (2023).

Early life
Born in Karachi, Pakistan, Vellani moved to Canada when she was a year old, and was raised in the Ismaili faith, a branch of Shia Islam. She graduated from Unionville High School in Markham, Ontario. Vellani was selected as a member of the TIFF Next Wave Committee at the 2019 Toronto International Film Festival. Before being cast in Ms. Marvel at the end of her last year of high school, Vellani had planned to attend the Ontario College of Art & Design University with a focus on integrated media.

Career
In September 2020, it was revealed Vellani was cast as the Marvel Cinematic Universe superhero Kamala Khan for Marvel Studios and Disney+'s streaming television miniseries Ms. Marvel. Vellani's aunt had forwarded her a casting call for the role, which led to her submitting a self-tape before being asked to audition in Los Angelesand eventually having two screen tests: an in-person one in February that year, as well as a virtual one over Zoom in June. Kamala Khan co-creator Sana Amanat, who served as an executive producer on the series, said Vellani revealed in her Zoom screen test that she, like Khan, is an Avengers fangirl. Amanat said, "She showed me every corner of her room, and it was covered with Avengers. Then she said, 'Oh, wait; I'm not done', opened up her closet, and there was more Marvel everywhere".

In June 2022, Vellani appeared in A Fan's Guide to Ms. Marvel, a documentary short about the production of the series. Featuring interviews with the filmmaking team and her, it was released on Disney+ before the premiere of Ms. Marvel. On June 8, 2022, Ms. Marvel premiered on Disney+, marking Vellani's onscreen debut. Both the series and her portrayal of the title character received widespread praise. Kathryn Porter of Paste wrote that Vellani "shines" in the role and that there was "no way to explain how great she is in this other than to say that she embodies the true spirit of Kamala Khan". Mohammad Zaheer of BBC Culture called her "an adorable bundle of charisma" in a role "tailor-made for her", while Angie Han of The Hollywood Reporter said that Vellani's full of "youthful verve and irresistible moxie" in her role. The miniseries concluded on July 13, 2022, consisting of six episodes. In July, Vellani appeared in Disney Wishs CGIimmersive interactive experience, Avengers: Quantum Encounter, reprising her role as Khan. The following month, she appeared in Assembled: The Making of Ms. Marvel, a documentary special focused on the process of conceptualising and creating the series, featuring on-set interviews with Vellani, cast members, and creatives. The special was released on Disney+, as the tenth installment of the anthology docuseries Marvel Studios: Assembled.

Vellani is set to reprise her role as Kamala Khan in the 2023 film The Marvels, a sequel to the 2019 film Captain Marvel, which is also intended to serve as a continuation of Ms. Marvel. She will also voice an animated version of the character for Disney+'s series adaption of the fifth episode of the animated series, What If...?.

Filmography

Film

Television

Theme park attractions

Awards and nominations

References

External links

2002 births
Living people
21st-century Canadian actresses
Actresses from Karachi
Actresses from Ontario
Canadian actresses of Pakistani descent
Canadian Ismailis
Pakistani emigrants to Canada
People from Markham, Ontario